Latitude Financial Services (shortened to Latitude Financial or Latitude) is an Australian financial services company with headquarters in Melbourne, Victoria, also doing business in New Zealand under the name Gem Finance. Latitude’s core business is in consumer finance through a variety of services including unsecured personal loans, credit cards, car loans, personal insurance and interest free retail finance.   it had around a 6% share of Australia’s personal lending market making it biggest non-bank lender of consumer credit in Australia.

History
Latitude began as the Australian and New Zealand personal finance and motor dealer finance operations of Australian Guarantee Corporation acquired from Westpac in 2002 by GE Capital.

GE Capital sold its Australian and New Zealand business in 2015 to a consortium led by Deutsche Bank, KKR and Värde Partners. The business was renamed Latitude Financial Services.

References

Companies based in Melbourne
Financial services companies established in 2015
Financial services companies of Australia
Kohlberg Kravis Roberts companies
2015 establishments in Australia